The Journal of Communications and Networks (print: , online ; formerly known as the International Journal of Digital & Analog Cabled Systems) is a scientific journal published by the Korean Information and Communications Society and technically cosponsored by the IEEE Communications Society. The journal publishes theoretical research contributions presenting new techniques, concepts, or analyses, applied contributions reporting on experiences and experiments, and tutorial expositions of permanent reference value are welcome. The subjects covered by this journal include all topics in communication theory and techniques, communications systems, and information networks.

External links
 
 IEEE Communications Society

IEEE academic journals
Bimonthly journals
Publications established in 1999
Engineering journals
Computer science journals
English-language journals